ProLiant is a brand of server computers that was originally developed and marketed by Compaq and currently marketed by Hewlett Packard Enterprise. After Compaq merged with Hewlett-Packard (HP), HP retired its NetServer brand in favor of the ProLiant brand. HP ProLiant systems led the x86 server market in terms of units and revenue during first quarter of 2010. The HP ProLiant servers offer many advanced server features such as redundant power supplies, Out-of-band management with iLO or Lights-out 100, Hot-swap components and up to 8-Socket systems.

Product lines

Modular Line (ML) 
ML server models are tower-based. They aim towards maximum expandability.

Density Line (DL) and RISC Line (RL) 
DL server models are rack-based. They aim towards a balance between density and computing power.

Available models through product generations

Scalable Line (SL) 
SL server models are rack-based. These models are mostly used in data centers and environments where a maximum of computing power is desired.

Blade Line (BL) 
BL server models are enclosure-based. They are made specially for use in a blade enclosure and cannot be used without such. Blade systems aim towards maximum density and manageability at limited rack space.

There are two models of blade enclosures: HPE BladeSystem c3000 Enclosure (8 Bays for Blades), and HPE BladeSystem c7000 Enclosures (16 Bays for Blades).

One advantage of HP/HPE Blade Enclosures compared to competitors (such as IBM Blade Systems) has been that the older generation enclosures have been able to accommodate new generation BL servers just by upgrading the firmware for OA in the enclosure (Onboard Administrator). However improvements to back-plane of the enclosure in the new generation enclosures have enabled faster I/O capabilities (such as 10Gbit/s Ethernet adapters and switches, and Infiniband). The physical design of the enclosures has not changed since the first versions (other than the larger LCD screen at the front compared to the first generation enclosures, and new plastic covers and HPE branding on the 3rd generation enclosures).

ProLiant MicroServer 

The HPE ProLiant MicroServer line of products are entry-level, low power, compact, and affordable servers meant for small business, home office, or edge computing. They offer user upgradable components and easy access to hard drives. There is the option to purchase the server with ClearOS installed in order for users to be able to enable applications via an easy-to-use web-GUI with minimal effort.

Details 
ProLiant servers are separated into four main product lines - ML, DL, BL, SY, and Apollo - which generally denote form factor. The ProLiant ML line comprises tower-based servers (convertible to rack mount) with capacity for internal expansion of disks and interconnects, while the DL line comprises general purpose rack mount servers. The BL line comprises blade servers which fit within the HP BladeSystem, the SY comprises the Synergy Blades, and the Apollo line comprises servers for scale out and High Performance Computing environments. The MicroServer product line addresses small and home businesses.

ProLiant servers are also split into several series which denote processor configuration.  The 100, 200, 300 and 400 series comprise single and dual socket capable systems, the 500 and 600 series comprise quad socket capable systems, and the 700 and 900 series comprise eight socket capable systems.  The 900 series supports up to 80 CPU cores and up to 4 TB of RAM.

Models with a '0' in the last digit use Intel processors while models with a '5' in the last digit use AMD processors.

The ProLiant forms part of the HP Converged Systems, which use a common Converged Infrastructure architecture for server, storage, and networking products. Designed to support 50 to 300 virtual machines, the HP ConvergedSystem 300 is  configured with ProLiant servers. A system administrator can manage ProLiant servers using HP OneView for converged infrastructure management. HP also provide drivers a software for managing servers such as Management Component Pack which includes hp online configuration utility (hponcfg), Agentless Management Service  amsd, Smart Storage Administrator (SSA) ssa, Smart Storage Administrator (SSA) CLI ssacli and Smart Storage Administrator Diagnostic Utility (SSADU) CLI ssaducli.

Timeline 
In February 2012, HP announced the ProLiant generation 8. In July 2013, HP announced a new blade server-based ProLiant, the HP Moonshot Server.

DL580 Gen8 is a "middle generation" between Gen8 and Gen9. This server has some of new features introduced in Gen9, primary there is available UEFI boot option.

Starting August 28, 2014, HP Proliant Gen9 series were available based on Intel Haswell chipset and DDR4 memory. First were the HP ProLiant ML350 Gen9 Server and HP ProLiant BL460c Gen9 Blade. Servers in this generation support both BIOS and UEFI.

Starting Q4 2017 HP Proliant Gen10 servers were available. Also in November 2017 HPE extended their Gen10 range to include AMD EPYC processors to further economics in server virtualization using EPYC's impressive price v cores architectures claiming to lower cost per virtual machine (VM) by 50%.

See also 

 HPE Integrity Servers
 List of Hewlett-Packard products

References

External links 
 
 HPE QuickSpecs, a database of HPE product information provided by HPE

HP servers
Ultra-dense servers
Computer-related introductions in 1993